Divine Revelation is an album by American jazz pianist Andrew Hill recorded in 1975 and released on the Danish SteepleChase label. The album features four of Hill's original compositions performed by a quartet and one jazz standard performed solo. The CD added one alternate take as a bonus track.

Reception

The Allmusic review by Scott Yanow awarded the album 2½ stars calling it "complex but logical music".

Track listing
All compositions by Andrew Hill except as indicated
 "Snake Hip Waltz" - 4:57  
 "Here's That Rainy Day" (Johnny Burke, Jimmy Van Heusen) - 3:39  
 "East 9th Street" - 6:25  
 "July 10th" - 7:53  
 "Divine Revelation" - 24:58  
 "July 10th" [alternate take] - 6:50 Bonus track on CD  
Recorded at C.I. Recording Studio, New York City on July 10, 1975

Personnel
Andrew Hill - piano
Jimmy Vass - flute (track 5), soprano saxophone (tracks 1 & 3), alto saxophone (tracks 4-6)
Chris White - bass (tracks 1 & 3-6)
Leroy Williams - drums (tracks 1 & 3-6)

References

SteepleChase Records albums
Andrew Hill albums
1975 albums